Oskar Strnad (26 October 1879 – 3 September 1935) was an Austrian architect, sculptor, designer and set designer for films and theatres. Together with Josef Frank he was instrumental in creating the distinctive character of the Wiener Schule der Architektur ("Vienna School of Architecture"). He stood for a modern concept of "living" for all people, planned and built private dwelling-houses, designed furniture, created ceramics and watercolours and designed sets and props for stage plays and films.

Biography

Strnad was born in Vienna on 26 October 1879 into a family of Jewish descent. From 1909 to 1935 he was a professor in the Wiener Kunstgewerbeschule ("School of Applied Arts in Vienna") along with Josef Hoffmann. From 1918 he created designs for a "round theatre" (Rundtheater) in collaboration with his pupil Margarete Lihotzky (later Margarete Schütte-Lihotzky). Among his other pupils were the later film architects and set designers Artur Berger and Harry Horner. In 1923 Strnad constructed the Drei-Szenen-Theater ("three-scene-theatre"), a three-part stage within a circular auditorium.

From 1919 he was stage designer for the Wiener Volkstheater. Later Strnad designed many highly acclaimed sets for the Wiener Staatsoper, including sets for Berg's  Wozzeck and for the premiere of Jonny spielt auf by Ernst Krenek. He also designed interiors for the lavish masterpieces of the "Wiener Film" such as Maskerade (1934) and Episode (1935).

He died in Bad Aussee on 3 September 1935.

Works
 1914 - The Austrian pavilion of the World Fair 1914 (Werkbund Exposition (1914)) (with Josef Hoffmann)
 1925 - The Austrian pavilion of the Exposition Internationale des Arts Décoratifs et Industriels Modernes (1925) (with Josef Hoffmann)
 1918 - "Rundtheater" (planned 1917)
 1923 - Realisation of the "Drei-Szenen-Theater" (3-part stage and circular auditorium)
 1926 - a theatre in Amsterdam
 1932 - double house, now destroyed, in the Werkbundsiedlung Wien
 1932 - house for ordinary people ("Volkshaus") in Wien 15, Holochergasse
 throughout his career, in Vienna and Lower Austria: numerous private houses and interior designs;
 throughout his career, in Austria: war graves and war memorials; chairs; decorative glass; sculptures; and so on
 in the Österreichisches Theatermuseum, Vienna: stage sets and costume designs (77 pieces).

Notes

Sources and external links
 
 elib.uni-stuttgart.de: OPUS - Offene Welten: die Wiener Schule im Einfamilienhausbau 1910 - 1938 (Meder, Iris) 
 Architekturzentrum Wien: Architektenlexikon - Oskar Strnad

Exhibition
O.S. 1879-1935 Jüdisches Museum Wien, Palais Eskeles, Dorotheergasse, Wien. Bis 24. Juni 2007. Catalogue, edited by Iris Meder & Jüdisches Museum Wien, 2007. Salzburg: Verlag Anton Pustet.

References
 Eisler, Max, 1936: O. Strnad. Mit ausgewählten Schriften des Künstlers
 Gregor, Joseph, 1949: O. Strnad. Sein Vermächtnis an das Theater
 Gregor, Joseph, 1936: Rede auf Oskar Strnad. Vienna: Reichner
 Stoklaska, J., 1960: O. Strnad. Dissertation, Vienna
 Niedermoser, Otto, 1965: O. Strnad. Vienna: Bergland
 Sothebys (New York), 20th Century Decorative Arts, March 11, 2004
 Levetus, A. S., Austrian Architecture and Decoration
 Schütte-Lihotzky, Margarete, 2004: Warum ich Architektin wurde. Salzburg: Residenz. 
 Spalt, Johannes (ed.), 1979: Der Architekt Oskar Strnad. Zum 100. Geburtstage am 26. Okt. 1979. Hochschule für Angewandte Kunst, Wien
 Weich, U., 1995: Die theoretischen Ansichten des Architekten und Lehrers O. Strnad. Thesis, Vienna
 Boltenstein, Erich (compiler), 1933: Die Wohnung für jedermann. Vorschläge für die Durchbildung und Verwendung einfacher Möbel für die heutige Wohnung: Entwürfe aus der Fachklasse für Architektur an der Kunstgewerbeschule in Wien, unter Leitung von Oskar Strnad. Stuttgart: J. Hoffmann. 1933

Austrian architects
Austrian designers
Austrian scenic designers
Austrian Jews
Artists from Vienna
1879 births
1935 deaths
Wiener Werkstätte
Burials at the Vienna Central Cemetery
Modernist architects from Austria